Arghaun Chowk (Nepali: ताल चोक) consists of a three-way junction road and its surrounding area, located in Ward Number 27 of Pokhara, Nepal.

Boundaries of Tal Chowk 

 East: Annapurna Chowk
 West: Rithepani
 North: Dadanaak
 South: Bhandadik

Office 

 Ward No 27 office.

Educational Facilities 
 Laxmi Adarsha School
 Diamond Secondary School

Banks 

 Nabil Bank.
 NIC Asia Bank.
 Agricultural Development Bank.
 NCC Bank.
 Kailash Bank.

Health Care 

 Shishuwa Hospital.

Communication 
ISPs available in Tal Chowk include:
 Worldlink.
 Nepal Telecom.
 Vianet.
 Classic Tech.

Transportation 
Privately run public transport systems operate throughout the city, adjoining townships and nearby villages. 
Public transport mainly consists of local and city buses, micro-buses, and metered-taxis.

Public buses in the city follow a color/size coded system:
 Pokhara Mahanagar Bus (colors: green, brown and blue)
 Bindabashini Samiti (colors: blue)
 Lekhnath Bus Bebasaya Samiti (colors: green and white)
 Phewa Bus Bebasaya Samiti (size: mini-micro)

References 

Neighbourhoods in Pokhara
Gandaki Province
Kaski District
Road junctions in Nepal